Marine Debauve (born 3 September 1988) is a French artistic gymnast who competed in the 2004 and 2008 Summer Olympics. As the 2005 all-around European Champion, Debauve is also the first French female gymnast to win a major international all-around title. She was also the 2003 and 2005 French all-around national champion.

Gymnastics career
Debauve first became interested in gymnastics at the age of 4 and participated in her first international competition at the age of 11. In 2003, she won the all-around French championship and took part in her first world championships. She represented her country at the 2004 Summer Olympics in Athens, Greece finishing 6th in the team event. In the all-around final she finished in seventh place, the highest ranking ever achieved by a French gymnast at the Olympics. 
A year later she was all-around champion at the 2005 European Championships, becoming the first Frenchwoman to win a major international all-around title. She also won the silver medal on beam at the same European Championships.

Although she initially retired in 2005 after winning the European Championships, Debauve returned to compete for France at the 2008 Summer Olympics. In the team final the French team finished in seventh place. Debauve currently lives in Dijon and was coached by Yves Kieffer and Marjorie Heuls.
After her gymnastic career, she decided to start a new sport, Tumbling. She did it for a year and half, and finished with a bronze medal at the World Championship in Metz, France.

World Cup Series

References

External links

1988 births
Sportspeople from Dijon
French female artistic gymnasts
Gymnasts at the 2004 Summer Olympics
Gymnasts at the 2008 Summer Olympics
Olympic gymnasts of France
Living people
Mediterranean Games silver medalists for France
Mediterranean Games bronze medalists for France
Competitors at the 2005 Mediterranean Games
Medalists at the Trampoline Gymnastics World Championships
Mediterranean Games medalists in gymnastics
European champions in gymnastics
21st-century French women